Anne Arundel County, also notated as AA or A.A. County, is located in the U.S. state of Maryland. As of the 2020 United States census, its population was 588,261, an increase of just under 10% since 2010. Its county seat is Annapolis, which is also the capital of the state. The county is named for Lady Anne Arundell (c. 1615/1616–1649), a member of the ancient family of Arundells in Cornwall, England, and the wife of Cecilius Calvert, 2nd Baron Baltimore (1605–1675), founder and first lord proprietor of the colony Province of Maryland.

Anne Arundel County is included in the Baltimore–Columbia–Towson metropolitan statistical area, which is also included in the Washington–Baltimore–Arlington combined statistical area.

History
The county was named for Lady Anne Arundell, (1615/1616–1649), the daughter of Thomas Arundell, 1st Baron Arundell of Wardour, members of the ancient family of Arundells in Cornwall, England. She married Cecilius Calvert, second Lord Baltimore, (1605–1675), and the first lord proprietor of the colony, Province of Maryland, in an arranged marriage contract in 1627 or 1628.

Anne Arundel County (modern spelling adds an 'e' to her first name of "Ann" and removes the second 'L' from the family name of "Arundell" – but the old traditional spelling of her name is still used in the title of the local historical society, the Ann Arundell County Historical Society) was originally part of St. Mary's County, the province's first erected county in the southern portion of the Province of Maryland, which had first been established by arriving settlers in 1634.  In 1650, the year after Lady Ann Arundell's death, the county separated from St. Mary's and "erected" into its own jurisdiction and became the third of the 23 Maryland counties.  It was composed of the hundreds of Town Neck, Middle Neck, Broad Neck, South River, West River, and Herring Creek.  Between 1654 and 1658, the county was known as "Providence" by many of its early settlers.

On March 25, 1655, after the English Civil War, (1642-1651), in Europe, the Battle of the Severn, the first naval colonial battle ever fought in America, was fought in Anne Arundel County on the Severn River between Puritan forces supporting the Commonwealth of England and forces loyal to Lord Proprietor Cecilius Calvert.  The Commonwealth forces under William Fuller were victorious.

In 1692, the Church of England, also known as the Anglican Church, became the established church of the Province of Maryland through an Act of the General Assembly. Ten counties had been established in the colony, and those counties were divided into 30 parishes, with vestrymen appointed within each. Ann Arrundell County was divided into four parishes: Herring Creek, South River, Middle Neck, and Broad Neck.

Between 1694 and 1695, the provincial capital of Maryland was moved from St. Mary's City along the northern shore of the Potomac River across from the southern colonial border with the Province of Virginia in St. Mary's County farther north along the western shore of the Chesapeake Bay, midway in the colony to Annapolis in Anne Arundel County.  Prior to the move, Annapolis was known as "Providence".

During the American Revolutionary War, citizens of Anne Arundel County supported the Continental Army by providing troops for three regiments.  The 3rd Maryland Regiment, the 4th Maryland Regiment, and the 6th Maryland Regiment were recruited in the county.

During the War of 1812, the one of the original six heavy frigates of the recently re-established United States Navy, U.S.S. Constitution, sailed from Annapolis prior to its victorious engagement with the H.M.S. Guerriere of the British Royal Navy.

This was the first regular railroad passenger service in the United States. In 1831, land west of the railroad was considered the Howard District of Anne Arundel County. In 1851, The Howard District was broken off to form Howard County, now the 21st county in Maryland (of 23).

The county has a number of properties on the National Register of Historic Places.

Geography
Anne Arundel County is located to the south of the city of Baltimore.

Most of the county's borders are defined by water. To the east lies the western shore of the Chesapeake Bay, and numerous tidal tributaries of the bay indent the shoreline, the various rivers, creeks, streams, inlets forming prominent peninsulas, also known as "necks" (as further south in Virginia). The largest of these tributaries include (from north to south), the Magothy River, Severn River, South River, and the West River. Further south, the upper Patuxent River forms the border of Anne Arundel with Prince George's County to the west. Deep Run forms part of the northwestern border with Howard County, and Lyons Creek forms part of the southern border with Calvert County. The Patapsco River to the north is the border with Baltimore County, but the communities and areas of Brooklyn and Curtis Bay neighborhoods (and adjacent Fairfield, Wagner's Point [also known as East Brooklyn], Arundel Cove [off of Curtis Creek], and Hawkins Point), lying south of the Patapsco River were annexed from Anne Arundel County to Baltimore City in the third major annexation of January 1919.

Anne Arundel County originally included all of the land between the Patuxent River and the Patapsco River (mainstem and South Branch) upstream to their headwaters on Parr's Ridge. The northwestern section of this long tract later became Howard County, with the border between the two running very close to the Atlantic Seaboard fall line. As a result, Anne Arundel County lies almost entirely within the Atlantic Coastal Plain, while Howard County is almost entirely within the Piedmont province.

The terrain is mostly flat or gently rolling, but more dramatic banks and bluffs can be found where waterways cut through areas of higher elevation.

With the exception of the very limited extent of Piedmont underlain by Precambrian to early Paleozoic metamorphic rock, all of the county is underlain by thick deposits of gravel, sand, silt, and clay dating from the early Cretaceous to Holocene times.  Most of these sediments are unconsolidated but include local formations of sandstone, especially in the Pasadena area.

Adjacent counties and independent city

 Baltimore City (north)
 Baltimore County (north)
 Calvert County (south)
 Kent County (northeast)
 Howard County (northwest)
 Prince George's County (southwest)
 Queen Anne's County (east)
 Talbot County (southeast)

National protected area
 Patuxent Wildlife Research Center (part)

Climate

 
Anne Arundel County has a humid subtropical climate, with hot summers and cool winters. Slightly colder winter temperatures and higher snowfall are experienced at the higher elevations, with slightly lower snowfall closer to sea level.

Politics and government

Anne Arundel County has had a charter government since 1965. The government consists of a county executive and a seven-member county council. These members are elected in the same years Maryland conducts its gubernatorial and legislative elections, and may serve a maximum of two consecutive terms.

The Democrats have the most registered voters in the county, but the large number of Republican-leaning independents means Republicans win more county-wide elections than in other mostly suburban counties in Maryland, but Democrats are the dominant party in Annapolis city elections. In the 2016 presidential election, Anne Arundel County voted for Hillary Clinton over Donald Trump by 6,016 votes. It was the first time that the county had supported a Democrat for president since 1964. Four years later, Joe Biden won the county by nearly 15%, the largest margin of victory for a Democrat in the county since the landslide election of Lyndon Johnson in the 1964 presidential election.

|}

County Executives
The County Executive oversees the executive branch of the county government, which consists of a number of offices and departments.  The executive branch is charged with implementing County law and overseeing the operation of the county government. The next election will be in 2022.

County Council
The County Council, as the legislative branch, adopts ordinances and resolutions, and has all of the county's legislative powers. The most recent county election occurred November 8, 2022.

Law enforcement

Several major law enforcement agencies serve Anne Arundel County:

 Anne Arundel County Police Department is headed by Chief Amal Awad.
 Anne Arundel County Sheriff's Office is headed by Sheriff Everett Sesker.
 Annapolis Police Department
 Maryland State Police
 Maryland Natural Resources Police 
 Maryland Transportation Authority Police
 Maryland Transit Administration Police
 Anne Arundel County Department of Detention Facilities

Demographics

2020 census

Note: the US Census treats Hispanic/Latino as an ethnic category. This table excludes Latinos from the racial categories and assigns them to a separate category. Hispanics/Latinos can be of any race.

2010 census
As of the 2010 United States Census,  537,656 people, 199,378 households, and 139,262 families were residing in the county. The racial makeup of the county was 75.4% White, 15.5% Black or African American, 3.4% Asian, 0.3% American Indian, 0.1% Pacific Islander, 2.4% from some other race, and 2.9% from two or more races. Those of Hispanic or Latino origin made up 6.1% of the population. In terms of ancestry, 23.3% were German, 18.6% were Irish, 12.3% were English, 7.4% were Italian, 5.0% were Polish, and 4.4% were American.

Of the 199,378 households, 34.6% had children under  18 living with them, 53.1% were married couples living together, 12.1% had a female householder with no husband present, 30.2% were not families, and 23.7% of all households were made up of individuals. The average household size was 2.63, and the average family size was 3.11. The median age was 38.4 years.

Males had a median income of $63,187 versus $48,750 for females. The per capita income for the county was $38,660. About 3.3% of families and 5.3% of the population were below the poverty line, including 6.9% of those under age 18 and 5.5% of those age 65 or over.

2000 census
As of the census of 2000,  489,656 people, 178,670 households, and 129,178 families were residing in the county. The population density was 1,177 people/sq mi. The were 186,937 housing units had an average density of 449/sq mi (174/km2). The racial makeup of the county was 81.24% White, 13.57% Black or African American, 0.30% Native American, 2.29% Asian, 0.06% Pacific Islander, 0.85% from other races, and 1.69% from two or more races. About 2.63% of the population were Hispanic or Latino of any race; 17.7% were of German, 13.1% Irish, 10.5% English, 8.1% United States or American, and 7.0% Italian ancestry.

Of the 178,670 households,  34.9% had children under 18 living with them, 57.2% were married couples living together, 11.1% had a female householder with no husband present, and 27.7% were not families. About 21.3% of all households were made up of individuals, and 6.4% had someone living alone who was 65 or older. The average household size was 2.65, and the average family size was 3.09.

In the county, the age distribution was 25.2% under 18, 8.10% from 18 to 24, 32.8% from 25 to 44, 23.9% from 45 to 64, and 10.0% who were 65 or older. The median age was 36 years. For every 100 females, there were 99.10 males. For every 100 females age 18 and over, there were 97.10 males.

Economy

Principal employers
According to the Maryland Department of Business and Economic Development, the following were the principal employers in the county in November 2014 (excluding U.S. post offices and state and local governments, but including public institutions of higher education).

Personal income
In 2000, the median income for a household in the county was $61,768, and the median income for a family was $69,019 (these figures had risen to $79,294 and $91,071 respectively as of a 2007 estimate). Males had a median income of $43,747 versus $32,348 for females. The per capita income for the county was $27,578.  About 3.60% of families and 5.10% of the population were below the poverty line, including 6.30% of those under age 18 and 5.80% of those age 65 or over.

State government
Several state agencies are headquartered in unincorporated areas in Anne Arundel County. Executive departments include the Department of Agriculture, the Aviation Administration, the Department of Housing and Community Development, and the Department of Transportation. The Rural Maryland Council, an independent agency, is also headquartered in an unincorporated area in the county.

State correctional facilities
The Maryland House of Correction, operated by the Maryland Department of Public Safety and Correctional Services, was located in Anne Arundel County.  The prison was closed in 2007.

The Maryland Department of Public Safety and Correctional Services operates several additional correctional facilities in the unincorporated town of Jessup in Anne Arundel County, including:

Brockbridge Correctional Facility
Jessup Correctional Institution
Jessup Pre-Release Unit
Maryland Correctional Institution – Jessup
Maryland Correctional Institution for Women

District of Columbia facilities
The District of Columbia Department of Youth Rehabilitation Services (DYRS) operates the New Beginnings Youth Development Center, a secure youth prison, in the county. Oak Hill Youth Center, the previous DYRS secure facility, was also in the county.

U.S. Department of Defense facilities
Fort George G. Meade is a large U.S. Army post located in the northwest of the county. It is the home of the National Security Agency.

The Naval Academy is located in Annapolis.

Healthcare
There are two full-service hospitals in Anne Arundel County: Anne Arundel Medical Center in Annapolis and Baltimore Washington Medical Center (formerly North Arundel Hospital) in Glen Burnie, part of the University of Maryland Medical System.

Media
 The newspapers of record are The Capital and the Maryland Gazette (now owned by The Capital), which was founded in 1727.

Education

 Children are educated by the Anne Arundel County Public Schools, which cover the entire county.
 Postsecondary education is offered by Anne Arundel Community College at several locations throughout the county.
 Anne Arundel County is also home to the United States Naval Academy and St. John's College, U.S., both in Annapolis.

Transportation

Anne Arundel County is the home of Baltimore-Washington International Thurgood Marshall Airport, commonly referred to as BWI.  BWI serves as the main airport for greater Baltimore.  It is also an increasingly popular alternative airport to residents of the Washington, D.C., area.  BWI is an East Coast hub for Southwest Airlines, meaning that direct flights are available between BWI and much of the country.

The southern portion of the Maryland Transit Administration's Light Rail system, connecting downtown Baltimore with BWI, runs through the northern part of Anne Arundel County.

The county also has multiple stops on the MARC commuter rail service, including a stop at BWI Rail Station, located near BWI Airport.  Amtrak trains also stop at BWI's train station.

The Laurel-based Connect-a-ride system operates two routes in the western portion of the county, including Severn, Arundel Mills, Maryland City, Glen Burnie, Hanover, and Odenton. Howard County's Howard Transit Silver route serves Arundel Mills shopping mall and BWI Thurgood Marshall Airport.

Major highways

Recreation

Maryland Park Service
Sandy Point State Park is located at the end of the Broadneck peninsula near the west end of the Chesapeake Bay Bridge. It features a beach and marina and hosts many festivals and special events throughout the year.  Helen Avalynne Tawes Garden is located at the Department of Natural Resources headquarters in Annapolis. The 5 acre garden features representations of the state's various geographic areas. 
The county also contains some of the easternmost portions of Patapsco Valley State Park, consisting of mostly undeveloped areas of forest and wetlands along the lower Patapsco River.

Anne Arundel Recreation and Parks
The Department of Recreation and Parks maintains "a comprehensive system of recreational programs for county residents and the preservation of valuable land," including indoor and outdoor sports facilities, community parks, green ways, archaeological, environmental, and historical preserves, and large regional facilities.  Some of the major facilities include the Baltimore & Annapolis Trail, Downs Park, Jug Bay Wetlands Sanctuary, Fort Smallwood Park, Kinder Farm Park, and Quiet Waters Park.

Other attractions include the Maryland Renaissance Festival in Crownsville, the Maryland State House and the Colonial Annapolis Historic District.

Anne Arundel County is home to the two largest shopping malls in the State of Maryland: Westfield Annapolis Mall and Arundel Mills in Hanover in addition to Marley Station Mall in Glen Burnie. Adjacent to Arundel Mills is the Maryland Live! casino.

Communities

Bracketed number refers to location on map

City
Annapolis (23) (county seat)

Town
Highland Beach (31)

Census-designated places

 Annapolis Neck (30)
 Arden on the Severn (18)
 Arnold (15)
 Brooklyn Park (32)
 Cape Saint Claire (21)
 Crofton (17)
 Crownsville (20)
 Deale (29)
 Edgewater (25)
 Ferndale (6)
 Fort Meade (2)
 Friendship
 Galesville
 Gambrills
 Glen Burnie (9)
 Herald Harbor (19)
 Jessup (1) (partly in Howard County)
 Lake Shore (13)
 Linthicum (7)
 Maryland City (3)
 Mayo (27)
 Naval Academy
 Odenton (16)
 Parole (22)
 Pasadena (10)
 Pumphrey (8)
 Riva (24)
 Riviera Beach (12)
 Selby-on-the-Bay (26)
 Severn (4)
 Severna Park (14)
 Shady Side (28)
 South Gate (5)

Unincorporated communities

 Beverly Beach
 Bristol
 Chestnut Hill Cove
 Churchton
 Davidsonville
 Fairhaven
 Germantown
 Gibson Island
 Green Haven
 Hanover (partly in Howard County)
 Harmans
 Harundale
 Harwood
 Hillsmere Shores
 Jacobsville
 Londontowne (25)
 Lothian
 Millersville
 Orchard Beach
 Owensville
 Riverdale
 Rose Haven
 Russett
 Sherwood Forest
 Sudley
 Tracys Landing
 Waysons Corner
 West River
 Winchester-on-the-Severn
 Woodland Beach

Notable people

Brady Barr, herpetologist and television host
Steve Bisciotti, owner of Baltimore Ravens
Peter Bondra, ice hockey player
Tamar Braxton, entertainer
Toni Braxton, entertainer
Jeff Hatch, football player
Johns Hopkins, philanthropist and founder of Johns Hopkins University
Craig Laughlin, ice hockey player and broadcaster
Ronald Malfi, author
Travis Pastrana, motosports competitor
Pat Sajak, entertainer
Mark Teixeira, baseball player
Steve Wojciechowski, basketball player and coach

References

External links

 
 
 Anne Arundel County Code
 Anne Arundel Elections Statistics
 Annapolis and Anne Arundel County Conference and Visitors Bureau
 Anne Arundel County Business Directory

 

 
1650 establishments in Maryland
Maryland counties
Populated places established in 1650
Maryland counties on the Chesapeake Bay
States and territories established in 1650